[[File:George Cruikshank, the rogue's march.png|thumb|upright=1.4|Napoleon is led off in The Rogue's March to the Island of Elba while a fifer and drummer perform the music. Cartoon by George Cruikshank.]]The Rogue's March (also Poor Old Soldier, in some contexts Poor Old Tory or The Rogue's Tattoo) is a derisive piece of music, formerly used in the British, American and Canadian military for making an example of delinquent soldiers, typically when drumming them out of the regiment. It was also played during the punishment of sailors. Two different tunes are recorded; the better known has been traced back to a Cavalier taunt song originating in 1642. Unofficial lyrics were composed to fit the tune. The march was taken up by civilian bands as a kind of rough music to show contempt for unpopular individuals or causes, notably during the American Revolution. It was sometimes played out of context as a prank, or to satirise a powerful person. Historically The Rogue's March is the second piece of identified music known to have been performed in Australia.

Musical form
The Rogue's March could be played by the regimental fifers or trumpeters, as the case might be, but these woodwind and brass instruments demanded different tunes.

Tune for fife

The best known tune was performed by fife and drum. It was played in  time or, by a slight change of tune, in  time. As many fifers and drummers as possible were assembled to play the ritual.

In keeping with the ritual's purpose, the fife tune had a "derisory and childlike quality". A British army punishment "since time immemorial", the tune shown here first appears in a fife book of 1756. That a very similar tune was used in the American army, in the Indian wars at least, was attested by General Frank Baldwin and corroborated by General Custer's widow.

Rhythmic pattern
It appears that the march could be identified from the drumbeat alone; thus played, it was called the Rogue's Tattoo. In one anecdote, members of a Scottish crowd recognised it when played by a solitary drummer, as was done in the naval ritual of flogging round the fleet (see below).

Origins
Scholars have proposed that The Rogue's March can be traced to a taunt song called Cuckolds Come Dig, citing its analogous use for expelling prostitutes from Edinburgh earlier in the eighteenth century ('the whore's march'). In fact, this song was well known in connection with the English Civil War; in Sir Walter Scott's novel Woodstock a character quotes the words 
to insult Roundheads, which rhythmic pattern has been said plausibly to fit the Rogue's March. The song with those words originated in 1642/3 when Royalist soldiers taunted Londoners digging defensive fortifications around the city.

Tune for military trumpet or bugle

The military field trumpet, like the bugle, had no valves and could not play the notes of the diatonic scale so a different tune had to be employed.

One such is known from America. By the end of the nineteenth century the bugle began to replace the traditional drummers and fifers for infantry use and by World War I regulations the brass instrument was universal. The tune shown here appears in an 1886 manual and again in Instructions for the Trumpet and Drum (Washington, 1915); an American training manual for machine-gunners heading for World War I (facsimile reproduced); and the U.S. Navy ship and gunnery drills 1927.

An American version for cornet – a valved instrument – of 1874 used the fife version of the tune.

Lyrics
Unofficial lyrics were fitted to versions of the tune; in the British army, perhaps as drinking songs. A well known version was:

Another version:

In America, both Generals Frank Dwight Baldwin and Hugh Lenox Scott remembered the following lyrics from their days on the Indian frontier:

Other sources recall similar words, but no other lyrics are attested. The above are not long enough to match the tune. The illustration – from memoirs edited by General Custer's widow – recalls how it was done. The first 8 bars were played instrumentally; the voices joined in as a sort of chorus.

Military uses

British Army
Corporal punishment, when it could be administered in the British army of the eighteenth and nineteenth centuries, was inflicted by the military bandsmen, e.g.: drummers, to increase the ignominy. Hence it was commonplace for it to be accompanied by music.

The Rogue's March was typically used for drumming out incorrigible offenders – often, those who stole from their comrades. The offender, after undergoing whatever additional punishment had been imposed, e.g.: a flogging, would be brought onto the parade-ground. Drummer boys would strip off his buttons and facings. The sentence would be read, the band would strike up the Rogue's March, and the offender would be marched through the ranks and out of the assembly and – in later practice – to a civilian jail.

To increase the humiliation he might be kicked in the bottom by the smallest drummer boy, and warned that he could expect severe punishment if he was seen there again. Sometimes a drummer boy led him with a halter [hangman's noose] around his neck. Soldiers' diaries record that the ritual made a very strong psychological impression on them.

The punishment might also be employed on camp followers: "Thieves, strumpets, &c are frequently disgraced in this manner".

By 1867 newspaper accounts could describe the procedure as "somewhat rare". However, in 1902 two Aldershot soldiers who stole war medals awarded to black servicemen by King Edward VII in person were drummed out to the Rogue's March and thence to prison with hard labour, after the King himself had sent a telegram deprecating the disgrace.

Royal Navy
Seamen were also drummed out of the Navy. One officer wrote that in a well run ship "the greatest punishment [is] to be turned out of the service with disgrace, and a bad certificate into the bargain", and citing two instances where he had had thieves "drummed out of the ship with the rough music of the Rogue's March", which put a stop to thieving. Others were less enlightened. Several documents describe The Rogue's March being played to accompany flogging in the Navy. Two accounts describe the extreme naval punishment known as flogging round the fleet where the march was played by a drummer boy placed in the bows of the boat as it passed from ship to ship.

American forces

The same march with a similar ritual was used in the American army and militia. In the 1812 war in one regiment "a soldier convicted of swindling had to forfeit half of his pay for two months, lose his liquor ration for the rest of the campaign, and – with his bayonet reversed and the right side of his face shaved close to the skin – be drummed up and down the lines to the Rogue's March three times". A soldier in the Mexican war was ridden out of camp on a rail to its tune. On the Texas frontier, recalled General Zenas Bliss, the usual penalty for desertion was fifty lashes "well laid on with a raw-hide" by the drummer-boys, after which his back was washed with brine; when he recovered, his head was shaved as closely as possible and he was drummed out to the fifes and drums of the Rogue's March.

In the Civil War both sides used the punishment for cowardice or theft; the man's head would be shaved and a humiliating sign was hung on him; the march was played and he was drummed out. On one occasion the entire Twentieth Illinois Volunteers ("a loose, rowdy bunch") was ordered to be marched off the parade ground – in the presence of other regiments – to the Rogue's March, which humiliated and infuriated the officers and men. General Meade expelled a newspaper reporter by having him placed backwards on a mule and led through the ranks to the Rogue's March. However the Rogue's March was also played at military executions by firing squad. It was used in a black militia sent to maintain law and order in the South in the Reconstruction era.

The expulsion could be lethal. An eyewitness recalled the practice during one of the Indian wars:

In some cases the culprit's offence was placarded e.g. “Deserter: Skulked through the war"; “A chicken-thief'; “I presented a forged order for liquor and got caught at it"; "I struck a noncommissioned officer"; “I robbed the mail — I am sent to the penitentiary for 5 years”.  This practice was obsolete by 1920.

In 1915 The Rogue's March was a prescribed item throughout the American Army, Navy and Marine Corps; the piece was "Played when a thief or other man is expelled the camp in disgrace". It appeared in 1917 drill regulations for machine-gun companies heading for World War I, and in 1927 drills in the Navy.

It appeared from Winthrop's Military Law and Precedents (1920) that the playing of The Rogue's March during ignominious discharge was a punishment considered appropriate for enlisted men, not officers.

Disuse
The last Marine to be drummed out to the Rogue's March – the ceremony was at Norfolk Marine Barracks and was attended by members of the public – was shown in Life magazine's Picture of the Week for April 20, 1962. The same month General David M. Shoup, commandant of the U.S. Marine Corps, ordered Col. William C. Capehart, commander of the barracks to "knock off" drumming out disgraced Marines, a practice the latter had revived in 1960. "The local commander neither asked for nor was given authorization for the ceremony", said Shoup.

By 1976 Chief Justice Burger referring to military disgrace could write: "The absence of the broken sword, the torn epaulets, and the Rogue's March from our military ritual does not lessen the indelibility of the stigma".

A 1995 article in Air Force Law Review argued that drumming out to the Rogue's March ought to be revived and would be good for discipline, but the humiliation risked counting as cruel and unusual punishment within the meaning of the Eighth Amendment. To get round this the article suggested the culprit should be asked to sign a consent form.

Canada
During World War II the Royal Canadian Regiment bugle band – which, having been officially disbanded, theoretically did not exist – smuggled its instruments ashore in the Allied invasion of Sicily. It was then reconstituted, duly performing the regimental music. "At a ceremonial promulgation of sixteen Courts-Martial, the culprits were drummed out of the regiment to the unhappy beat of the ‘Rogue's March’.’’

Australia
The First Fleet arrived in Botany Bay in 1788; the colony was officially proclaimed on 9 February; on the 11th, three individuals were drummed out of the camp for fornication. Hence the first named piece of music known to have been performed in Australia – apart from God Save the King – was the Rogue's March.

The Sudds-Thompson case was an event in the early history of New South Wales. In 1825 two soldiers, Sudds and Thompson, decided to steal from a shop and get caught on purpose, because they thought convicts had better long term prospects than soldiers. However the governor General Darling decided to make an example of them. According to Charles White's Convict life in New South Wales:  Whether Darling acted legally has been debated. One of the men died and the case turned into a major political controversy.

Rough music, subversion and pageantry

American Revolution
Like Yankee Doodle, British troops were known to play the Rogue's March to annoy troublesome colonial citizens. When Paul Revere published a seditious cartoon a British regiment mustered outside the printer's shop: "With their colonel at their head and the regimental band playing the Rogue's March, they warned the publisher he would be next to wear a coat of tar and feathers".

The colonials retaliated. Fife and drum bands often played the Rogue's March while Loyalists were manhandled by mobs. One victim included Leigh Hunt's father – a happening duly commemorated by the citizens of Philadelphia in a 1912 pageant.

When Benedict Arnold was hanged in effigy for treachery his 'corpse' was carried in procession with fifes and drums playing the march. And when the crowd pulled down the statue of George III in Bowling Green, New York, on 9 July 1776 they carried it off to the tune of the Rogue's March.

A surviving manuscript shows the tune was also known as Poor Old Tory, 'Tory' being another name for Loyalist.

Post-independence America
During the Federalist-Republican struggles of the 1790s the Rogue's March was used as rough music to harass Federalist congressmen. Fifers and drummers played it under Thomas Jefferson's windows at a time when he was deeply unpopular. When vice-president Aaron Burr was acquitted of treason in 1807, a Baltimore mob hanged him (together with presiding Chief Justice Marshall) in effigy while a band played the Rogue's March. At the 1868 Republican National Convention a brass band played Hail to the Chief for candidate Ulysses S. Grant but the Rogue's March for the "seven traitors" (the Republican senators who voted against the impeachment of Andrew Johnson).

The march was also associated with mob violence. In some labour disputes in nineteenth century America unpopular masters might hear drum and fife bands playing the Rogue's March as a prelude to tarring and feathering or riding out on a rail. During the anti-abolitionist riots of 1834, in Norwich, Connecticut

In 1863 the Washington DC police "rounded up a batch of thieves, pickpockets, and prostitutes, many from the Murder Bay area. Then they herded the culprits down Pennsylvania Avenue to the train station and out of the city, appropriately followed by a brass band serenading the gathering with The Rogue's March."

United Kingdom
In the mutiny of the Nore (1797) rebellious seamen seized a boatswain and, in a parody of the naval punishment, rowed him round the Fleet while a drummer beat the Rogue's March.

Those burned in effigy while bands played the Rogue's March have included:
Guy Fawkes (for trying to destroy the Protestant monarchy). 
Thomas Paine (frequently, for writing the Rights of Man) 
Thomas Babington Macaulay (for offending Highlanders in his History of England), and
Cardinal Wiseman and Pope Pius IX (for restoring the Catholic hierarchy in England).

Satire or pranking

The Rogue's March concept has often been used for satirical purposes, especially during the Napoleonic Wars.

On 17 March 1735 John Barlow, organist of St Paul's Church, Bedford, was dismissed for playing The Rogue's March while the Mayor and Aldermen were processing down the aisle.

In March 1825 in Union, Maine, Captain Lewis Bachelder was court-martialled for letting the regimental band strike up The Rogue's March when their colonel entered.

In literature and popular culture
The expression "to face the music" (to confront the unavoidable) may derive from the Rogue's March ritual, though there are alternative theories.

The Rogue's March: A Romance, a novel by E. W. Hornung (author of the Raffles stories), is set in Australia and was in part inspired by the Sudds-Thompson case mentioned in this article.

In the monologue "Sam Drummed Out". written in 1935 by R.P Weston and Bert Lee and most notably performed by Stanley Holloway, Private Sam Small is court-martialed for "maliciously putting cold water in beer in the Sergeants' canteen." When he refuses to defend himself, he is found guilty and "drummed out": "Then the drums and the pipes played the Rogues March/ And the Colonel he sobbed and said, 'Sam,/ You're no longer a Soldier, I'm sorry to say/ Sam, Sam, you're a dirty old man.'"

Rogue's March is a 1953 American film in which a British officer is falsely accused of treason and drummed out of the regiment.

Rogue's March (1982) is a noir spy novel by "W. T. Tyler" (Samuel J. Hamrick) about a CIA officer in Central Africa.

In the television adaption of Sharpe's Eagle, the Rogue's March is played at the very beginning of the film when the South Essex first appears marching. It is also played ironically when Major Lennox (Captain in the book) under orders from Colonel Sir Henry Simmerson leads a company to chase off a small French patrol, an action that the major knows is a fool's errand; he is quickly proven right when the company is ambushed by French cavalry, costing Lennox his life. The song is also sung by John Tams (who played "Rifleman Daniel Hagman" in the series) and Barry Coope on the companion album Over the Hills & Far Away: The Music of Sharpe

Rogue's March is a 1999 album by punk rock band American Steel.

See also
Charivari
Drumming out

Notes

Sources

Books and journals

}

Newspaper and magazine reports

External links
The Rogue's March (fife version) played by the Band of the Royal Military School of Music & Kneller Hall.
The Rogue's March (bugle version). Played in 1908 by the cornets and trumpets of Arthur Pryor's band. (Track 2: at 01:49/03:06.)
The last man to be drummed out of the US Marine Corps to the Rogue's March (photo in Life Magazine.

Bugle calls
Crowds
Military justice
Military marches
Military music
Protests
Punishments
Riots and civil disorder
Songs about soldiers